Trnava (also known by other alternative names) is a city in western Slovakia,  to the northeast of Bratislava, on the Trnávka river. It is the capital of a kraj (Trnava Region) and of an okres (Trnava District). It is the seat of a Roman Catholic archbishopric (1541–1820 and then again since 1977). The city has a historic center. Because of the many churches within its city walls, Trnava has often been called "Little Rome", or more recently, the "Slovak Rome".

Names and etymology

The name of the city is derived from the name of the creek Trnava. It comes from the Old Slavic/Slovak word tŕň ("thornbush") which characterized the river banks in the region.  Many towns in Central Europe have a similar etymology including Trnovo in Slovakia as well as Tarnów (Poland), Tarnow (Germany), Veliko Tarnovo (Bulgaria), Trnava and Trnavac (Serbia); and Tyrnavos (Greece) among others. In Hungarian, the original name had gradually evolved into Tyrna which influenced also later German and Latin forms.

When it developed into an important market town, it received the Hungarian name of Nagyszombat (Sumbot 1211) referring to the weekly market fairs held on Saturdays.  However, this name was only used by the royal chamber, as is indicated by the adoption of the Slovak name rather than the Hungarian name by German newcomers after the Mongol invasion.

History

Permanent settlements on the city's territory are known from the Neolithic period onwards.

Middle Ages
During the Middle Ages, an important market settlement arose here at the junction of two important roads – from Bohemia to Hungary and from the Mediterranean to Poland.

The first written reference to Trnava dates from 1211. In 1238, Trnava was the first town in (present-day) Slovakia to be granted a town charter (civic privileges) by the king. The former agricultural center gradually became a center of manufacture, trade, and crafts. By the early 13th century, the king of Hungary had invited numerous Germans to settle in Trnava; this settlement increased after the Tatar invasion in 1242. At the turn of the 13th and 14th centuries, a part of Trnava was enclosed by very long city walls. The original Slovak market settlement and the Germans stayed behind this wall.

Trnava was also the place of many important negotiations: Charles I, the king of Hungary, signed here a currency agreement with the Czech King John of Luxemburg in 1327, and King Louis I (who often stayed in the town and died there in 1380) signed a friendship agreement with Emperor Charles IV there in 1360.

Hussites and Slovak majority
The temporary German majority in Trnava's population yielded in favour of the Slovaks during the campaigns undertaken by the Czech Hussites in the 15th century. In April 1430, the Hussites penetrated close to the town and defeated the Hungarian army in the Battle of Trnava. However, they suffered heavy losses and withdrew to Moravia. On 24 Jun 1432 a small group of Hussites masked as tradesmen entered the town, overcame the guards in the night and captured the town without a fight. Then, they made Trnava the center of their campaigns in northwestern Kingdom of Hungary from 1432 to 1435.

16th-18th centuries
The town, along with the rest of the territory of present-day Slovakia, gained importance after the conquest of most of what is today Hungary by the Ottoman Empire in 1541, when Trnava became the see (1541–1820) of the Archbishopric of Esztergom (before 1541 and after 1820 the see was the town of Esztergom, which was conquered by the Ottoman Turks in 1543). The cathedrals of the archbishopric were the Saint John the Baptist Cathedral and the Saint Nicholas Cathedral in the town. Many ethnic Hungarians fleeing from the Turks moved to the town after 1541 from present-day Hungary, which remained under Ottoman rule until 1699.

In the 16th and especially the 17th century, Trnava was an important center of the Counter-Reformation in the Kingdom of Hungary (at the time largely identical with the territory of present-day Slovakia and a strip of western Hungary). The Archbishop Nicolas Oláh invited the Jesuits to Trnava in 1561 in order to develop the municipal school system. Subsequently, he had a seminary opened in 1566 and in 1577 Trnava's priest Nicolas Telegdi founded a book-printing house in the town. The first Catholic Bible translation into Hungarian (based on the Latin Vulgate) was also completed in the town by the Jesuit György Káldi who was born there in 1573. The 17th century was also characterized by many anti-Habsburg uprisings in the country – these revolts of Stephen Bocskay, Gabriel Bethlen, George I Rákóczi, and Imre Thököly negatively affected Trnava's life. On 26 December 1704 Francis II Rákóczi's army suffered a decisive defeat against the Imperial Army, led by Sigbert Heister, near Trnava.

The Jesuit Trnava University (1635–1777), the only university of the Kingdom of Hungary at that time, was founded by Archbishop Péter Pázmány. Founded to support the Counter-Reformation, Trnava University soon became a center of Slovak education and literature, since most of the teachers, one half of the students and the majority of the town's inhabitants were Slovaks. Pázmány himself was instrumental in promoting the usage of Slovak instead of Czech and had his work "Isteni igazságra vezető kalauz" (Guide to the Truth of God) and several of his sermons translated into Slovak. From the late 18th century Trnava became a center of the literary and artistic Slovak National Revival. The first standard codification of Slovak (by the priest Anton Bernolák in 1787) was based on the Slovak dialect used in the region of Trnava.

19th century to Great War
During the Hungarian Revolution of 1848 Richard Guyon's army fought here with an Austrian army on 14 December, in 1848.

The importance of the town decreased in the early 19th century, when the university was moved to Buda (today: Eötvös Loránd University) and the see of the archbishopric moved back to Esztergom. It increased however partly again after 1844, when Trnava was connected with Bratislava through the first railway line in the Kingdom of Hungary, which was a horse railway (steam engines were used since 1872). The railway connection launched a modernization of the town, which started with the erection of a big sugar factory, a malt-house and of the Coburgh's factory (later referred to as Trnavské automobilové závody, i.e. "Trnava Car Factory"). The  (Spolok sv. Vojtecha), founded in 1870 when the Slovak foundation (Matica slovenská) was prohibited by the Hungarian authorities, kept up the Slovak national conscience at a time of strong Magyarisation in Hungary. In the 19th but mainly in the early 20th century the town grew behind its city walls and a part of the wall was demolished in the 19th century, but most of it is still well-preserved.

Jewish history
Jews arrived into the area in the 11th century. A presence in Trnava is documented from the 14th century. In 1494, 14 Jews were brought to death by burning following a blood libel. An 1503 account of the 1494 ritual murder trial introduces for the first time in history the notion that Jews as a collectivity were of feminine gender and had monthly bleedings, a libel which would become part of the repertoire of Christian antisemitism from then on. After another blood libel, the Jews were expelled from the city in 1539 and only in 1783 were Jews allowed to return to the city. Until World War II, Trnava was home to a sizable Jewish minority. During the Holocaust, 82% of the Jews were sent to extermination camps in 1942.

After 1918
After the creation of Czechoslovakia in 1918, Trnava was one of the most industrialized cities of the country. During World War II, Trnava was occupied on 1 April 1945 by troops of the Soviet 2nd Ukrainian Front. In 1977, by a decision of Pope Paul VI, Trnava became the see of a separate Slovak archbishopric (although the seat moved to Bratislava in 2008, the city still remains a seat of its own archbishopric). With the establishment of this archbishopric, Slovakia became independent of Hungary again also in terms of church administration for the first time in centuries.

After the establishment of Slovakia (1993), Trnava became the capital of the newly created Trnava Region in 1996. The French car manufacturer PSA Peugeot Citroën began construction of a large automobile plant in Trnava in 2003.

Geography

The closest mountain ranges are the Little Carpathians to the west and the Považský Inovec to the north-east of the city.

Climate
Trnava lies in the north temperate zone and has a continental climate with four distinct seasons. It is characterized by a significant variation between hot summers and cold winters.

Main sights

As early as in the Middle Ages, Trnava was an important centre of Gothic religious and lay architecture – St. Nicolas's Church, St. Helen's Church and several church monastery complexes (Clarist, Franciscan and Dominican) were built in this period.

The Renaissance (16th century) added a town tower to Trnava's silhouette. Nicolas Oláh ordered the erection of the Seminary and Archbishop's Palace. The town ramparts were rebuilt to a Renaissance fortification as a reaction to the approaching Turkish danger from the south.

The 17th century was characterized by the construction of the Paulinian Church that bears badges of Silesian Renaissance. Trnava was gradually redesigned to Baroque. The erection of the St. John the Baptist Church and of the university campus launched a building rush that continued with the reconstruction of the Franciscan and Clarist's complexes. Builders and artists called to build the university also participated in improvements of the burgher architecture. The Holy Trinity Statue and the group of statues of St. Joseph, the Ursulinian and Trinitarian Church and Monastery are of recent construction.

The District hospital was built 1824. The building of the theatre started in May 1831 and the first performance was played at Christmas. Both of the Trnava synagogues, historical structures with oriental motifs, date back to the 19th century.  The Synagogue Status Quo Ante currently houses the Jána Koniareka art gallery.

Culture and sights

Museums
 Galéria Jána Koniarka (Ján Koniarek Gallery)
 West-Slovak Museum

Controversies

Renovated in 2010, the 19th-century Orthodox Synagogue which was falling into disrepair, was turned into a chic, modern cafe named Synagoga Cafe in 2016.

Critics view the business as an example of exploitative cultural appropriation in the wake of the Holocaust, where the former occupants were sent to concentration camps. Whereas, advocates argue that it reflects respect and nostalgia for Jews in addition to providing a vehicle for at least some preservation of the heritage site.

Demographics

Historic
The rise of Trnava is closely related to the "Latin Guests", newcomers speaking a Romance language, probably arriving from present-day Belgium (Walloons). In 1238, the expansion of the town was supported by the decree about a free movement to Trnava. In the Middle Ages, "German Guests" played a main role in the social composition of the town and they dominated also in trade and town administration. The decline of the German population and a permanent change of the ethnic composition dates back to the occupation of the town by the Hussite army (1432-1435). Nevertheless, the continuity of the original Slovak population was not interrupted and the Slovaks have intensively tried to achieve representation in the town council. Repeated conflicts between Germans and Slovaks were resolved in 1486 by the king Matthias Corvinus. In this time, the dominant language in the town was already Slovak. The medieval Hungarian population was represented only by several families, but more Hungarians settled in town after the Battle of Mohács of 1526 and the subsequent dissolution of the Hungarian kingdom which was split into three parts. The ethnic new tensions had to be again resolved by the king. The Hungarians were made equal to the Slovaks and the Germans by Ferdinand I, who also ordered parity representation of all three nationalities in the administration (4 April 1551). The estimated size of the population in the 16th century was 2,000-3,000 citizens. At the end of the Middle Ages, the town was inhabited by cca 5,000 people including those living in suburbs behind the city walls. A presence of the Jewish community is well documented from the 14th century.

Modern
According to the last census from 2001, Trnava had 70,286 inhabitants, while according to the estimate from 2006, Trnava had 68,466 inhabitants with an average age of 37.3 years. In 2018, it had 65,207 inhabitants.

Nationality (2001 census):
Slovaks (96.89%)
Czechs (0.79%)
Romas (0.27%)
Hungarians (0.21%)

Age:
Pre-productive Age: 9,947
Productive Age: 46,742
Post-productive Age: 11,603

Government
The current government structure has been in place since 1990, and is composed of a mayor (primátor) and of a city council (Mestské zastupiteľstvo), which in turn leads a city board (Mestská rada) and city commissions (Komisie mestského zastupiteľstva). The mayor is the city's top executive officer, elected for a four-year term; the current mayor is Peter Brocka, who is serving his first term and was inaugurated to function on 12 December 2014. The city council is the highest legislative body of the city, represented by 31 councillors, elected to a concurrent term with the mayor's. Since 2002, Trnava is divided into six urban districts, with area and further sub-units in parentheses:
Trnava-centre (2.15 km2; Staré mesto [Old Town], Špiglsál)
Trnava-west (20.60 km2; Prednádražie)
Trnava-south (8.03 km2; Tulipán, Linčianska)
Trnava-east (10.66 km2; Hlboká, Vozovka)
Trnava-north (22.33 km2; Kopánka, Zátvor, Vodáreň)
Modranka (7.76 km2)

However, compared to the present-day total area of 71.53 km2, the city used to have a larger area. Its height was in the 1970s, when it annexed villages of Modranka, Biely Kostol and Hrnčiarovce nad Parnou, reaching an area of almost 90 km2. The latter two separated in 1993 and 1994, respectively.

Education

Trnava is the seat of two universities: University of Trnava (present) with 7,159 students, including 446 doctoral students. and of the University of Ss. Cyril and Methodius, with 6,833 students. The city's system of primary education consists of nine public schools and one religious primary school with a total of 5,422 pupils enrolled in 2006. Secondary education is represented by four gymnasia with 2,099 students, 7 specialized high schools with 3,212 students, and 6 vocational schools with 3,697 students.

Transport

Road
The city lies at the crossroads of two roads of international importance; from the Czech Republic to southern Slovakia and from Bratislava to northern Slovakia. The D1 motorway connects the city to Bratislava, Trenčín and Žilina and the R1 expressway connects it to Nitra. A part of a planned bypass is currently under construction.

Rail
The city also has an important station on the Bratislava–Žilina railway, with two tracks from Sereď and Kúty (near the Czech border) ending in the city.

Air
Although there is a small airstrip Letisko Boleráz to the north of the city, the closest international airports are in Bratislava and Vienna.

Local public transit
The city also operates a public transport service, currently with 16 lines.

Recreation

Parks and open spaces 

 Ružový park
 Janko Kráľ park
 Bernolákov sad
 Park of Belo IV
 Park pri Kalvárií
 Park SNP
 Univerzitný parčík
Recreation zone Štrky
Trnava ponds

Notable residents

Blažej Baláž (born 1958), Slovak conceptual artist
Mária Balážová (born 1956), Slovak painter
Juraj Beneš (1940–2004), composer
Anton Bernolák (1762–1813), priest, writer, the author of the first Slovak language standard
Pavol Blažek (born 1958), race walker
Libor Charfreitag (born 1977), hammer thrower
Karol Dobiáš (born 1947), football player
Vilmos Fraknói (1843–1924), Hungarian-Jewish, Roman Catholic priest, historian, secretary of HAS, titular bishop, canon of Várad
Károly Hadaly (1743–1834), Hungarian mathematician
Maximilian Hell (1720–1792), Hungarian astronomer
Jozef Heriban (born 1953), Slovak novelist and screenwriter
Ányos Jedlik (1800–1895), Hungarian scientist, inventor, teacher, member of the Order of Saint Benedict
Miroslav Karhan (born 1976), football player
Zoltán Kodály (1882–1967), Hungarian composer
Taťána Kuchařová (born 1987), Miss Czech Republic 2006, Miss World 2006
Louis I of Hungary (1326–1382), King of Hungary, Croatia and Poland
Anton Malatinský (1920–1992), Slovak/Czechoslovak football player and coach
Igor Matovič (born 1973), Prime Minister of Slovakia
Milan Mikuláš (born 1963), triple jumper
Jozef Miso (born 1973), football player
Nicolaus Olahus (1493–1568), Hungarian archbishop
Péter Pázmány (1570–1637), Hungarian cardinal and statesman
János Sajnovics (1733–1785), Hungarian astronomer and linguist
Mikuláš Schneider-Trnavský (1881–1958), composer and conductor
Marek Ujlaky (born 1974), football player
Rudolf Vrba (1924–2006), co-author of the Vrba-Wetzler report, professor of pharmacology at the University of British Columbia
Alfred Wetzler (1918–1988), co-author of the Vrba-Wetzler report

Twin towns — Sister cities

Trnava is twinned with:

 Balakovo, Russia
 Břeclav, Czech Republic
 Casale Monferrato, Italy
 Chomutov, Czech Republic
 Kharkiv, Ukraine
 Novo Mesto, Slovenia
 Sangerhausen, Germany
 Szombathely, Hungary
 Varaždin, Croatia
 Zabrze, Poland

See also
FC Spartak Trnava, football club from the city
HK Trnava, ice hockey club from Trnava
RC Spartak Trnava, football club from the city
Trnava Bulldogs, American Football club from the city.  
Tirnavia choir

Notes

References

External links

 
 Official Tourism and Travel Guide to Trnava
 Public urban transport in Trnava
 Trnava University in Trnava
 University of St. Cyril and Methodius in Trnava

 
Cities and towns in Slovakia